Antonio Karmany Mestres (born 21 January 1934) is a Spanish former professional road racing cyclist.

Major Results

1957
1st, Stage 6, Vuelta a Levante
1958
1st, Gran Premio de Primavera
1959
1st, Stages 4a & 6, Volta a Catalunya
1st, Stage 2, Vuelta a España
1960
1st, Subida al Naranco
1st, Stage 7, Volta a Catalunya
4th, Overall, Vuelta a España
1st, Mountains classification
1st, Stage 17b
1961
1st, Subida a Urkiola
1st, Stage 3, Volta a Catalunya
1st, Stage 1a(TTT), Vuelta a Levante
8th, Overall, Vuelta a España
1st, Mountains classification
1st, Stage 15
1962
1st, Overall, Volta a Catalunya
1st, Mountains classification, Vuelta a España
1963
1st, Subida al Naranco
1st, Stage 4, Volta a Catalunya
1st, Stage 3a, Tour of the Basque Country
1965
1st, Stage 2, Vuelta a Andalucía

External links

Living people
Spanish male cyclists
1934 births
Spanish Vuelta a España stage winners
Sportspeople from Mallorca
Cyclists from the Balearic Islands